The Sea That Thinks (Dutch: De zee die denkt) is a 2000 Dutch experimental film directed by Gert de Graaff.  The film makes heavily use of optical illusions to tell a "story within a story" revolving around a screenwriter writing a script called The Sea That Thinks.  The script details what is happening around him and eventually begins to affect what happens around him.

External links

Official site

2000 films
2000s Dutch-language films
Dutch drama films
2000 drama films
2000 fantasy films
Dutch fantasy films
Dutch avant-garde and experimental films
Existentialist films
Films about philosophy
Metafictional works
Optical illusions